Jan Husarik may refer to:

 Jan Husarik (artist) (born 1942), Slovak naïve artist 
 Jan Husarik (politician) (born 1961), Serbian politician